Full service (also known as hometown radio) is a type of radio format; the format is characterized by a mix of music programming (usually drawing from formats such as adult contemporary, country, or oldies) and a large amount of locally-produced and hyperlocal programming, such as news and discussion focusing on local issues, sports coverage, and other forms of paid religious and brokered content.

It is found mainly on small-market AM radio stations in the United States and Canada, particularly on locally-owned stations in rural areas, although it was once the norm even in larger cities prior to about the 1970s and could be found in some large markets as late as the 1980s. The format differs from community radio in that full-service radio is almost always a commercial enterprise and is not as often ideologically-driven (especially liberal) as some of the more prominent community radio operators are. Nonprofit community radio stations often run formats comparable to those on commercial full-service radio, albeit usually with less mainstream music.

Programming
Programming generally heard on full service stations can include:

 Local and national (or top-of-the-hour) news, sometimes including agriculture reports.
 At least one local talk show (often under a generic name such as Viewpoint, Dialogue, or Hotline), occasionally along with syndicated talk programming. These are usually politically neutral and offer local organizations and businesses time to talk about upcoming events in an unscripted format. Other programs may have an "open line" format reflecting a conservative orientation, often reflecting a community's political predilections (and thus not following the orthodoxy of national conservative talk radio), rather than those of national broadcasters such as the traditional radio networks; likewise, if such stations are in more left-leaning communities, the shows may carry a progressive lean.
 Music, frequently drawing from a number of popular formats. Common ones include middle-of-the-road, adult contemporary, country, and oldies/classic hits. These usually appeal to listeners outside of the "key demographic;" that is, people over 50 years of age. Other listeners usually prefer narrower formats, where a particular music is played, or news and talk are broadcast, by a station 24 hours per day, seven days per week.
 Automated programming in overnight time slots, or, depending on Federal Communications Commission designations, even a sign-off (many daytime-only stations run full-service formats).
 Tradio, a free advertising service for individual listeners (not businesses) to offer items for sale. This may be known under various names, such as "Swap Shop" or "Trading Post."
 High school football, basketball and other local sports. Frequently, there will be an NCAA Division I university broadcasting football and basketball games (or, in the Northern United States, ice hockey), and often a smaller college in the market – especially if the college does not have its own station – will also have its games carried on the station; a full-service station may also affiliate with a major professional sports league team's radio network (this is especially true of the NFL, which plays most of its games during the daytime on Sundays, when all AM stations are able to operate).
 Locally-based contests or prize giveaways, such as the "cash call", where a dollar amount is read by the announcer and a caller who has submitted an entry to the contest is called to tell the host what the amount is to win a check in that amount, usually a sum between $20-$75; if guessed wrong, the amount is increased and the jackpot rolls over. (This is similar to a typical interstitial feature during movies shown on local television, Dialing For Dollars, which was common from the 1950s through the 1970s.)
 Sunday morning church services, often from several local congregations. Sometimes, a station will also have a daily sermonette at some point during the day, from possibly a rotating pool of clergy giving a brief but inspirational message, Bible reading, or "thought for the day." Unlike most specialty religious-formatted stations, "preach and teach" programs from national ministries may or may not be featured, depending on local custom. Conversely, major-market stations that are corporately owned are apt to carry local church services less frequently or not at all, preferring instead to carry automated, syndicated or brokered programming, or use syndicated features, such as the daily commentary of Focus on the Family, in place of local-based religious broadcasts.
 Limited brokered programming, usually during off-peak hours.
 Significant local advertising. Similar to community newspapers, small full-service stations have an advantage of being an attractive advertising option for smaller businesses that only need to reach a small footprint and thus would not advertise on larger corporate-run stations, due to their higher ratings and, in turn, higher rates. Thus full-service stations tend to work best in small towns that have large numbers of small businesses that can advertise on the station due to its affordability.

Depending on the ethnic composition of the station's coverage area and/or ownership and management, at least a portion of a full-service station's weekend programming is often set aside for ethnic or specialty music programming such as polka, Italian music, native American music, Celtic music or other widely varying ethnic programming, almost always by a local host. Many stations also set aside a block of programming for golden oldies, or music from the 1920s through early 1960s, with genres ranging from early rock and roll and pre-1965 country music to pop standards, swing, jazz, big band and – sometimes – existing recordings predating the 1920s. Again, this music overwhelmingly appeals to older listeners who remember the genres from their youth and have no interest in following current-day trends in popular music typically favored by their children and grandchildren.

Background
Full-service radio was the predominant form of radio broadcasting during the network radio era, before the debut of contemporary hit radio (top 40) in the 1950s. Top 40 and other narrowly-defined formats were adopted in large measure to replace network programming that was fast disappearing in favor of those networks' television operations, which were gaining high popularity at the time. In the old-time radio era, most stations would mix local programs (of a wide variety) with the networks' offerings. The name of the format implies that the station serves a broad spectrum of listeners and demographics with small portions of various types of programming. 

Since the full-service format is traditionally confined to AM and rural listeners, oldies/classic hits, adult standards and classic country tend to form the basis of most music rotations on these stations. Full-service stations tend to have somewhat more of a freeform playlist, allowing disc jockeys to play favorite tunes, and as such, album cuts, B-sides, "forgotten 45s," local bands and lesser-known performers and songs can see more air time on a full-service station than on most other commercial formats. The freeform playlist also enables jockeys to fit in caller requests more frequently, whereas larger stations owned by corporations may only take requests at designated times if at all (and then have restrictions on top of that, such as only current hits plus recurrents within a certain time frame). Also, large-market stations almost always play music determined by a consulting service, and their announcers usually have little to no say over their playlists.

Full service is not one of the formats defined by Nielsen; in most cases, full-service stations are usually listed under the blanket category of "variety." Smaller full-service stations rarely show up in the Nielsen Ratings in part due to their general refusal to pay for the company's services; lack of participation in Nielsen also allows such stations to set their own advertising rates in response to what the market supports, rather than having Nielsen prescribe a suggested level.

In the United Kingdom, the term "full service" is sometimes used to refer to the Independent Local Radio stations of the 1970s and 1980s, which were contractually obliged to feature a broad range of output (specialist music, speech, sports commentary, minority programs) as opposed to the tightly targeted all-pop music stations of the 1990s and 21st Century.

In New Zealand, the format was known as community radio and was widespread amongst the smaller centers until the late 1990s, when these stations were replaced with network programming.

Radio formats